Edward Uchenna Ubosi is a Nigerian politician who served as the speaker of Enugu State House of Assembly.

References 

Living people
Year of birth missing (living people)
Enugu State politicians
Speakers of state legislatures in Nigeria